Stenotrema calvescens, common name Chattanooga slitmouth, is a species of air-breathing land snail, a terrestrial pulmonate gastropod mollusk in the subfamily Triodopsinae of the family Polygyridae.

References

 Grimm, F.W. (1971). Two new Stenotrema, with notes on S. hirsutum and S. barbatum. The Nautilus, 85(1): 12-17.
 Richards, H. G. (1934). A list of the mollusks of the District of Columbia and vicinity. The American Midland Naturalist, 15(1): 85-88.
 InvertEBase. (2018). Authority files of U.S. and Canadian land and freshwater mollusks developed for the InvertEBase

External links 
 Say T. (1817). Descriptions of seven species of American fresh water and land shells, not noticed in the systems. Journal of the Academy of Natural Sciences. Philadelphia 1(1): 13–16, 17–18
 Say, T. (1824). Class Mollusca. In: Narrative of an expedition to the source of St. Peter's River, Lake Winnepeek, Lake of the Woods, &c. &c. performed in the year 1823, by order of The Hon. J.C. Calhoun, Secretary of War, under the command of Stephen H. Long, Major U. S. T. E. compiled from the notes of Major Long, Messrs Say, Keating, and Calhoun, by William H. Keating, A. M. &c. H.C. Carey & I. Lea, Philadelphia. 2: 256-266, plates 14-15
 Baker, F. C. (1927). Descriptions of new forms of Pleistocene land mollusks from Illinois with remarks on other species. The Nautilus. 40(4): 114-120
 Lee, H. G. (2010). Gettleman key to probe of major reversals. American Conchologist. 38(4): 6-11

Polygyridae
Gastropods described in 1961